Hna Pin Lain Tae Yee Sar Sar is a 2012 Burmese romantic-comedy film, directed by Nyi Nyi Htun Lwin starring Yan Aung, Ye Aung, Pyay Ti Oo, Kyaw Kyaw Bo, Myint Myint Khine, Soe Myat Thuzar, Khine Hnin Wai and Wutt Hmone Shwe Yi.

Synopsis
When Shein's mother got Nadi's love letter for Shein, she suspected her husband. When Nandar's father got Shein's love letter for Nandar, he suspected his wife. In this film, you will see the problems caused by a love letter with comedy.

Cast
Pyay Ti Oo as Shein
Wutt Hmone Shwe Yi as Nadi
Kyaw Kyaw Bo as Soe Htun Khine
Khine Hnin Wai as Nandar
Yan Aung as U Aung Myat Shwe
Myint Myint Khine as Daw Khin La Won
Soe Myat Thuzar as Daw Yin Yin Mya
Ye Aung as U Nay Min
Pwint as Pwint
Heavy Phyo as Hein

References

2012 films
2010s Burmese-language films
Burmese romantic comedy films
Films shot in Myanmar
2012 romantic comedy films